János Vető (born 14 December 1953, Budapest) is a Hungarian visual artist, photographer, video artist, musician, songwriter, singer and composer. He has been involved with non-conformist photo art, visual art and alternative music culture since the late '60s.

Biography 
Vető was born in Budapest in 1953. He was a child actor at Madách Theater in Budapest. He has been active in photography, film and music since the late 1960s. In 1962 he met János Baksa Soós, singer of the band Kex. He collaborated with Kex on some of their concerts in 1969-70. He was an intern at the Hungarian News Agency (Hungarian Telegraphic Office) where he worked together with Gergely Molnár, singer of the band Spions. Vető was the photographer, assistant, cameraman, permanent co-worker of the performance artist Tibor Hajas from 1976 until Hajas's death in 1980. In the '80s, he created paintings, sculpture and installations with the painter Lóránt Méhes Zuzu using the name Zuzu-Vető. He founded the band Trabant with Gábor Lukin and Marietta Méhes in 1981. Vető has been living in Denmark and Sweden since the early '90s. He deals with digital image making, writes lyrics and music, sings, plays the ukulele and the kaossilator.

Since 1990 he is from time to time collaborating with the Swedish artist Maria Lavman Vetö. They have made several installation- and musicprojects. They are married and are living together.

Career 

Vető founded the Apropos Film Photo experimental film and photo studio with his friends around 1966-67 and the art action group KOMMUNART in 1972. His experimental music bands, playing intuitive music, are Kec-Mec, Apropos Filmphoto Cartoonband (Apropó Film Fotó Rajzfilmzenekar) and Hymnus. His first solo photography exhibition, Spárgatárlat, was held at Bercsényi Club in Budapest in 1974. His photographs are considered to be exceptional because of their progressivity and sensitivity.

"...his photographic work that radically challenged the conventions of portraits, self-portraits, and nudes..."

Vető collaborated with the body artist Tibor Hajas. Between 1976 and 1980, as Hajas's photographer, co-worker and friend, Vető participated in the preparation and implementation of Hajas's performances as well as in the creation of works (photo series) based on the performances which were published under both of their names. These works were featured in the Central Pavilon, Giardini at the 57th Venice Biennale at the invitation of the chief curator, Christine Macel.

Vető founded "postmodernist social-impressionist neo-barbaric" art with painter Lóránt Méhes Zuzu in 1981. They created drawings, paintings, sculpture and textile works using the name Zuzu-Vető. They applied markers, coloured pencils, brushes and spray and decorated their paintings (Two Hearts are a Couple, 1983) and textile works (Work Flag and Love Flag) with beads, feathers and various everyday objects. Stones, bones and transistors were applied on their sculptures (Űrkőkorszaki szoborportrék/Cellar Statue portraits from the Space-Stone Age), and they named their extremely colourful installations made by using blue vitriol and powder paint as "gardens" (Űrkőkorszaki pinceszoborkert/Basement Sculpture Garden from the Space-Stone Age, 1982, Szentendre, Vajda Lajos Studio). Each of their solo exhibitions is an installation that consists of their works and impromptu sculptures, their personal belongings as well as found objects (Tibeti Őszi Tábor/Tibet Autumn Camp, 1981, Budapest, Young Artists Club; Új zászlók, új szelek/New Flags, New Winds 1983, Budapest, Young Artists Club).

Vető founded the band Trabant with Gábor Lukin and Marietta Méhes in 1981, providing the script ideas and the characters for film director and screenwriter János Xantus' film Eskimo Woman Feels Cold. His other ensembles/groups: Malter és Vödör (Mortar and Bucket),  Gagarin Pilótazenekar (Gagarin Pilot Band), Európa Kiadó. He founded I.M.A. (International Music Association) with Ivan E. Vincze in Copenhagen in 1998.

Since the '90s Vető has also been dealing with digital music and digital image making. He creates digital prints and videos using the name NahTe (Pixelvideos). One of his favorite materials is the bubble wrap used for packaging that he adopts as a base for paintings, sculptures, photos and videos.

In the summer of 2018 Vető created the Jó idő (Good Time) album with the members of the band Balaton.

Between 2007-2019, he created the Duo, Fluo Trio series from his digital images using the iron printing technique, the pastel and zinc painting, the scanning and the Ferrari printing.

The first two iron print paintings, IPP (Iron Print Painting), were made in 2013, followed by a large series of paintings and several videos in 2020-2021.

He publishes his videos on his own YouTube video channel NahTe53.

Exhibitions

Selected solo exhibitions 

 2022 Found Images, Nemdebárka, Horány-Szigetmonostor • Domän#2 (with Dániel Erdély and Maria Lavman Vető), galeri ffrindiau, Budapest
 2021 Domän (with Dániel Erdély and Maria Lavman Vető), Galleri Rostrum, Malmö
2020 Narcissus and Psyche and various new old pieces, Gallery Pegazus, Szentbékkálla
 2020 Duo, Trio, Fluo, aqb Project Space, Budapest
 2019 Introduction, Galleri Rostrum, Malmö
 2018 Vintage, Bubble Wrap, Pixel, galeri ffrindiau, Budapest - Colored Old Air, Höörs Konsthall, Höör
 2016 Vigil, acb NA, Budapest
 2013 Witty, Budapest Gallery, Budapest  RELAX (with Maria Lavman and Lotte Tauber Lassen), Malmö Nordic 2013, Malmö - We Are Resurrected (Zuzu-Vető), Neon Gallery, Budapest
 2012 Public art, Verzó online Gallery
 2009 Photographs 1975-1986, Vintage Gallery, Budapest
 2008 Beautiful nothing, Me-Mo-Art, Budapest - NahTe 14 videohaiku and other electro-doodling, Pixel Gallery, Budapest - Tibor Hajas latest works in collaboration with János Vető, Vintage Gallery, Budapest
 2007 Mari és Évike (Zuzu-Vető), Me-Mo-Art Gallery, Budapest - Zuzu-Vető works – Méhes Lóránt Zuzu retrospective, Ernst Museum, Budapest - Fotografi i fokus, ADDO, Malmö
 2006 Zuzu-Vető, Kisterem Gallery, Budapest
 2005 Tibor Hajas (1946-1980): Emergency Landing, Ludwig Museum, Budapest
 2003 Colored Old Air, Hungarian House of Photography-Mai Manó House, Budapest
 1997 In memoriam Tibor Hajas, Ernst Museum, Budapest
 1996 Hang on Vision in collaboration with Maria Lavman Vetö, Politiken, Copenhagen - Hommage to the holy light-bulb, Articsók Gallery, Budapest
 1995 Hommage to the holy light-bulb (with Maria Lavman Vető), Overgaden - Institute for Contemporary Art, Copenhagen - Ultimate pictures, Vizivárosi Gallery, Budapest
 1994 Invisible Unhearable Unbelievable in collaboration with Maria Lavman Vetö, Újlak Gallery, Budapest 
 1991 Make babies not art in collaboration with Maria Lavman Vetö, Liget Gallery, Budapest 
 1989 Galerie Notuno, Geneva - Méhes Lóránt, Vető János, Gasner János, Kiss László, Margitszigeti Víztorony, (Margaret Island Water Tower) Budapest
 1988 Liget Gallery, Budapest - Guitar lesson for Aliens, Almássy Hall, Budapest
 1987 Photographs with artificial light, Almássy Hall, Budapest - New York-New York, Liget Gallery, Budapest - Budapest-New York, Kunstlicht Galerie, Frankfurt
 1986 Photos, Liget Gallery, Budapest
 1985 Post-traditionelle Kunst, (Zuzu-Vető), Galeria Mana, Vienna
 1984 Flags, obo, obosutras, (Zuzu-Vető), Stúdió Gallery, Budapest
 1983 New flags, New Winds, (Zuzu-Vető), Young Artists Club, Budapest - The First Three Stones, (Zuzu-Vető) Ifjúsági Ház (Youth House), Székesfehérvár
 1982 Cellar Sculpture Garden, (Zuzu-Vető), Vajda Lajos Studio, Szentendre - It's beautiful today, (Zuzu-Vető), Rabinext Gallery, Budapest
 1981 Tibet Autumn Camp, (Zuzu-Vető), Young Artists Club, Budapest - Zelfportret en Dialog, Galerij Micheline Swajcer, Antwerp - New Tractor Operating Agency, (Zuzu-Vető), Bercsényi Club, Budapest - Bam-Bam, Just A Little Louder, (Zuzu-Vető),1981, Bercsényi Club, Budapest
 1979 Excavation, Bercsényi Club, Budapest
 1977 Galerie Schweidebraden, Berlin
 1975 Young Artists Club, Budapest
 1974 ’Spárgatárlat’, Bercsényi Club, Budapest
 1973 Concept art (with KOMMUNART), Tomb of Gül Baba, villa Wágner, Budapest

Selected group exhibitions 

 2021 Paris Photo (acb Gallery and Einspach Fine Art & Photography Gallery), Paris
 2020 ORD SOM BILD /BILD SOM ORD 2020 – Artists Books inspirerat av Lasse Söderbergs poesi, Galleri Rostrum, Malmö
 2019 Epoch Treasures, Danube Museum, Esztergom
 2018 Promote, Tolerate, Ban: Art and Culture in Cold War Hungary, Wende Museum, Culver City, California
 2017  Viva Arte Viva  (with Tibor Hajas), Central Pavilon, Giardini, 57th Venice Biennale, Venice - Summer Show, acb Gallery, Budapest - Two-way movement Focus: Hungary, viennacontemporary, Vienna - With the Eyes of Others, Elizabeth Dee Gallery, New York  - Hungarian Gaze, National Museum, Warsaw
2016-2017 Progressive Intentions, The Hungarian Institute in Istanbul, Istanbul
 2016 Lights of the Night. Cooperation and Interaction with Tibor Hajas, Cabaret Voltaire, Zürich - The Freedom of the Past, Mai Manó Ház, Budapest
 2014 Waldsee 1944 and Cruel mailing – Anti-Semitic postcards 1895-1930, 2B Gallery, Budapest - Fetish, Taboo, Relic, Vajda Lajos Studio, Szentendre - 1, 2, ! ? „Itt jelentkezzen öt egyforma ember” – Concept ’palimszeszt’ or the Hungarian conteptualism, Art Gallery, Paks - Hungarian Hippies, Karton Gallery, Budapest
 2013 The Naked Man, Ludwig Museum, Budapest
 2010-2012 Global All Stars concerts, Islands Brygge, Copenhagen
 2012 The Other Half of the Sky. Selection from the Ludwig Museum's Collection, Ludwig Museum, Budapest
 2009 Karneval-Karneval, Erlangen / Berlin - Gallery Night Budapest, Mucius Gallery, Budapest - NOW, Gödör Terasz Gallery, Budapest - Kontor Orkester Rostrum, Malmö -  „Brännaren 2”, Malmö - Björn Ross Micro Art Festival, Rostrum, Malmö - Berlinale special on Central European Cold War Films, Berlin
 2008 Beautiful Nothing, MeMoArt Gallery, Budapest -14 Videohaiku and other electro-scratch, Pixel Gallery, Budapest - Karneval-Karneval, Fleet Street Theater, Hamburg  - János Vető – Photographs 1975-1986, Vintage Gallery, Budapest - Neo-avantgarde tendencies, Zichy Castle, Budapest
 2007 „Mari és Évike” (Zuzu-Vető), MeMoArt Gallery, Budapest
 2006 Karneval-Karneval, Fleet Street Theater, Hamburg - Urban Contact Zone: Sharing Areas – Using Places, Hamburg
 2005 What's Next? – Neighborhoods and Artistic Practices, Copenhagen - Neofoton, Szentendre - FMK – those 80s’, Kogart, Budapest
 2001 Regard Hongrois – Hungarian Gaze, Palais Royal, Paris
 2002 New works, Liget Gallery, Budapest
 2000 Media Modell - Interactive technics, Kunsthalle, Budapest
 1999 Documentum, Kunsthalle, Budapest
 1995 Encuentro en Copenhagen – Reencuentro en Bilbao, (with Maria Lavman Vetö, Ada Ortega Camara, Peter Lind) La Brocha, Bilbao
 1994 Group picture, Vigadó Gallery, Budapest -’80s – Fine Arts, Ernst Museum, Budapest- Variations for Pop Art, Ernst Museum, Budapest
 1994 Panel (with Maria Lavman Vető, Lotte Tauber Lassen), Liget Gallery, Budapest
 1993 Panel (with Maria Lavman Vető, Lotte Tauber Lassen), Fotografisk Galleri, Copenhagen
 1993 "The Hungarian Epigon Exhibition 2", in collaboration with Maria Lavman Vetö Kampnagel, Hamburg
 1992 "Ung Skulptur", in collaboration with Maria Lavman Vetö, Skovlunde Bypark, Köpenhamn
 1991 "The general art-strike exhibition Perpeetum Mobile" in collaboration with Maria Lavman Vetö, Genéve, Antwerp
 1991 Still Life (with Maria Lavman Vető and Szerencsés János) Fészek Gallery, Budapest 
 1990 TRIUMF det ubeboelige, Charlottenborg, Kobenhaven / Kunsthalle, Budapest
 1989 Junge Ungarische Fotografen, Galerie Treptow / Galerie Pumpe, Berlin - The Metamorphic Medium : New Photography from Hungary, The Alllen Memorial Museum, Oberlin, Ohio
 1988 Zeitgenössische Ungarische Fotografie. Fotogalerie Wien, Vienna
 1987 Ungarsk samtids forografi, Museet der Fotokunst Out of Eastern Europe: Private Photography, MIT Visual Arts Centre, Cambridge, Massachusetts
 1986-87 Aspekte Ungarischer Malerei der Gegenwart, Erholungshaus der Bayer AG, Leverkusen / Stadhalle Hagen / Stadthaus Galerie, Münster
1986 1ère Biennale Internationale pour la Photographie d`Art et de Recherche, Galerie Dongue, Paris - In Quotes, Csók István Képtár, Székesfehérvár 
 1985 101 objects, Óbuda Gallery, Budapest - Unkarin maalaustaidetta 1945-1985, Kaupungin talon Ala-Aula, Helsinki - Hungarian Arts in Glasgow – Eighteen Artists, Glasgow Art Center, Glasgow - Drei Generationen Ungarischer Künstler, Neue Galerie am Landesmuseum, Graz - Caption, Kunsthalle, Budapest
 1984 Newly painted, (Zuzu-Vető), Ernst Museum, Budapest - Plánum ’84 Art Festival, (Zuzu-Vető), Almássy Hall, Budapest - Gud & Gramatik, (Zuzu-Vető), Charlottenborg, Kobenhaven - Grenzzeichen ’84, (Zuzu-Vető), Landesgalerie im Schloss Esterházy, Eisenstadt
 1983 "Álomi szép képek", (Zuzu-Vető), Óbuda Gallery, Budapest
 1982 Egoland Art, Fészek Gallery, Budapest 
 1981 Tendencies 1970-1978, Óbuda Gallery, Budapest - Fact-picture – The History of Hungarian Photography 1840-1981, Kunsthalle Art und Telekomunikation, Vienna-Berlin-Budapest
 1980 6 Hongaarse kunstenaars, Museum Hedendaagse, Antwerp
 1979 Biennale of Sydney, The Art Gallery of New South Wales, Sydney - Works and Words, De Appel Arts Centre, Amsterdam
 1978 Moderne Fotografie aus Ungarn, Galerie Schwaindebraden, Berlin
 1976 Exposition, Hatvany Lajos Museum, Hatvan
 1975 Montage, Young Artists Club, Budapest
 1974 Comic, Young Artists Club, Budapest

Discography 
 Zuzu-Vető: Új zászlók, új szelek/ New Flags new Winds. in: Radio Artpool No.3, Cassette-radio, radio-work. Budapest-Vienna Concert over the Phone, 1983.
 Trabant: Eszkimó asszony fázik (Eskimo Woman Feels Cold), 1984
 Európa Kiadó: PopZENe, 1987
 Európa Kiadó: Koncert a Zichy kastélyban /  Concert at Zichy Castle, 1986/1990
 Az Éjszakák Egyesült Álma / United Dream of Night's: A Hymnus én vagyok avagy az Apropó film-fotó rajzfilm zenekar igaz története, 1988
 Apropófilmfotórajzfilmzenekar: A forradalom után / After the revolution
 Mia Santa Maria (Maria Lavman Vetö) and Kina Herceg: Kézimunka / Handwork, 1990
 Mia Santa Maria (Maria Lavman Vetö) and KINA Herceg: Johnny gitár, 1991 (soundtrack for Sándor Sőth's movie)
Mia Santa Maria (Maria Lavman Vetö) and KINA Herceg: Mosolyszünet / Smiling Pause, 1994, cassette,  Bahia Music
 IPUT/NahTe: NEWNEEFLUGREEZ HYMNS, 2002
 The Intuitiv Trio: Concert, 2004
 NETRAF-music: NETRAF-titok (száj- és körömfájás). Műzene műfényben / NETRAF-secret (hoof and mouth disease) - Mock-Music in Mock-Light
 BHGIM Intuitive records
 Tapintat band: Jó idő / Good time. János Vető aKína herceg NahTe CsendVan (pronounced: XendFan) with Balaton, 2018.
 NahTe: Süss fel Nap! VillanyNahTe 2018. október /Let the sun shine! ElectricNahTe 2018 October

Filmography 

 Apropo Film Photo productions  (experimental films by Dr. Putyi Horváth, Alfréd Járai, János Vető, 1967-1987) - director, cameraman, actor
 Öndivatbemutató (short film by Tibor Hajas, 1976) - cameraman
 Az éjszaka ékszere (video by Tibor Hajas, 1976) - cameraman
 Vendég  (video of Tibor Hajas, 1976) - cameraman
 Női kezekben  (short film by János Xantus, 1981) - actor
 Trabantománia (BBS short film by János Vető, 1982) - director, cameraman
 Anna Müller (short film by István Antal, 1982) - actor
 Eszkimó asszony fázik (feature film by János Xantus, 1983) - actor, lyricist
Ex-kódex (feature film by Péter Müller Sziámi, 1983) - actor
 A szobáról  (experimental film by János Vető, 1984) - director, cameraman
 Spirál (experimental film by János Vető, 1984) - director, cameraman
 A fekete macska (experimental film by István Antal, 1987) - composer
 Forradalom után (feature film by András Szirtes, 1990) - composer
 Johnny Gitár (feature film by Sándor Sőth, 1991) - screenwriter, protagonist, composer
 Blue Box (feature film by Elemér Káldor, 1992) - actor
 Elszállt egy hajó a szélben I-II. - KEX (documentary film by András Kisfaludy, 1998) - character

Books 
 János NahTe Vető (Vető Kína Herceg): Színezett régi levegő. A NahTe bemutatja Vető János és Kína herceg fényképmunkáit digitális nyomatokon + néhány eredeti ezüstzselatin című, a Magyar Fotográfusok Házában 2003. május 24. és 2003 július 8. között rendezett kiállítás katalógusa, CD melléklettel  Ed.: László Beke, Gabriella Csizek; Hungarian House of Photography  – MTA Művészettörténeti Kutatóintézet, Bp., 2003 /Coloured Old Air; 2003. Budapest, Books of the Hungarian House of Photography (catalogue of the exhibition Colored Old Air, Hungarian House of Photography, 24 May 2003 – 8 July 2003, with CD, Hungarian House of Photography-Institute of Art History, Hungarian Academy of Sciences)  (in Hungarian)
 Image whipping. Tibor Hajas' (1946-1980) photo works with János Vető / Képkorbácsolás. Hajas Tibor (1946-1980) Vető Jánossal készített fotómunkái. Ed: László Beke, Transl.: Csaba Kozák; MTA Művészettörténeti Kutatóintézet Bp., 2004  (in Hungarian, in English)
 Géza Bereményi – János Vető : Antoine és Désiré. Fényképregény az 1970-es évekből; photo: János Vető; Corvina, Bp., 2017. Antoine and Désire. Photoromance from '70.  (in Hungarian)

Writings 
 János Vető: A fény éjszakái (Hajas Tiborról)/ Nights of Light (About Tibor Hajas); in: Orpheus, 1999/21.
 János NahTe Vető (Vető Kína Herceg): Photoessay, 1999
 NahTe: Neon mese / Neon tale, 2013

Awards 
 2010 Munkácsy Award
 2009 Major János Award NEWNEEFLUGREEZ Jesus Christ Award
 1987 Derkovits Gyula Award (with Méhes Lóránt)

Sources
 Sándor Szilágyi: Neo-Avant-Garde Trends in Hungarian Art Photography 1965-1984. Art+Text, Budapest, 2017 
Paula Ely: János Vető Nahte. Photoculture 1 August 2018
Tibor Hajas: Töredékek az „új fotóról”-ról. Mozgó Világ. 1977
Emese Kürti: János Vető: Vigil, acb NA, Budapest, 2016
 Noémi Forián Szabó: Nyugi, nyugi a szociálimpesszionista neobarbár kerék forog. in: Artmagazin 2006/6.
„NahTe videohaikui és elektrofirkái” – Vető János videóinak kiállítása. est.hu, 2008
Kata Balázs: Színezett régi levegõ. NahTe bemutatja Vetõ János és KINAherceg fényképmunkáit in: Balkon 2003/6-7.
 Carolina Söderholm: En ungersk bubblare. János Vető aka NahTe: Colored old air, Höörs konsthall, t o m 18/11. Sydsvenskan 10 November 2018
Galántai György beszélgetése Beke Lászlóval a Vető–Zuzu kiállítás kapcsán. in: Artpool Letters, 1983/2. (February)
 Endre Rózsa T.: Vető János. Egy elsüllyedt kontinens túlélője; in: Fotóművészet, 2015/3.
 Noémi Forián Szabó: Vető János NahTe: Duo-Trio-Fluo. in: Balkon.art 2020/2.
Michael Diemar: The Hungarian Neo-Avante-Garde. in: The Classic 2021/5.
Vera A Fehér: „Szerintem a digitális fénykép egyedül képernyőn életképes…” – beszélgetés Vető Jánossal. in: PUNKT 2021/05!11.
Noémi Forián Szabó: Vető János: Iron Print Paintings. in: Artmagazin 2021/9. 
Carolina Söderholm: Hä är konsten du inte ska missa. Carolina Söderholm guidar till utställningar värda ett besök. Sydsvenskan 25 September 2021

References

1953 births
Living people
Hungarian photographers
Hungarian songwriters
Photographers from Budapest